The Los Alisos leaf-eared mouse (Phyllotis alisosiensis) is a species of rodents in the family Cricetidae. It is found in Argentina.

References

Phyllotis
Mammals of Argentina
Mammals described in 2010